HMS Itchen may refer to one of the following British Royal Navy ships named after the English River Itchen:

 , a  launched in 1903 and torpedoed in the North Sea on 6 July 1917 by the German U-boat .
 , a  launched in 1942 and sunk on 23 September 1943 when hit by an acoustic homing torpedo fired by the German submarine .
 , a  launched on 30 June 1984. She was based at Southampton (Solent Division RNR), sold to the Brazilian government in 1998, and renamed Bracui.

References
 
 

Royal Navy ship names